Claudia Maria Schiffer (born 25 August 1970) is a German model and actress based in the United Kingdom. She rose to fame in the 1990s as one of the world's most successful models, attaining supermodel status. In her early career, she was compared to Brigitte Bardot.

She has appeared on more than 1000 magazine covers and holds the record for the model with the most magazine covers, listed in the Guinness Book of World Records. In 2002, Forbes estimated her net worth to be around US$55 million.

Early life 
She has two brothers, Stefan and Andreas, and one sister, Ann Carolin (born 1975). Schiffer is fluent in three languages – German, English and French.

Career

Modelling 

Schiffer originally aspired to become a lawyer and used to work in her father's law firm. In October 1987, at age 17, she was scouted in a nightclub in Düsseldorf by Michel Levaton, the head of Metropolitan Model Agency, and was later signed to the agency as a model. After leaving high school, Schiffer flew to Paris for a trial photo shoot, and subsequently appeared on the cover of Elle.

In 1989, she starred in campaigns for Guess?. Guess? co-founder Paul Marciano said in E! Forbes Top 15 Supermodel Beauties Who Made Bank, "Guess? name became really much more known around the world because [of] Claudia". Early on in her career, Schiffer was said to resemble Brigitte Bardot. After several other magazine appearances including the cover of British Vogue, shot by Herb Ritts, Schiffer was selected by Karl Lagerfeld to become the new face of Chanel, where she walked in her first fashion show in January 1990.

Named one of the most beautiful women in the world, her ability to appeal to a global audience assured an internationally successful career spanning over 25 years. In addition to Elle and Vogue, Schiffer has appeared on the covers of numerous other magazines including Harper's Bazaar, Cosmopolitan, and Time, and was the first model to be featured on the covers of Vanity Fair, Rolling Stone, and People. She was one of 10 models on Vogues 100th anniversary cover in 1992. In May 1997, Schiffer was featured on the cover and in the pictorial of Playboy. She has appeared on a total of more than 1,000 magazine covers.

Schiffer has walked in fashion shows for various fashion houses, including Versace, Karl Lagerfeld, Chloé, Yves Saint Laurent, Christian Dior, Fendi, Michael Kors, Dolce & Gabbana, Ralph Lauren, Balmain, Louis Vuitton, Prada, Anna Sui, Oscar de la Renta, Jil Sander, Donna Karan, Helmut Lang, Thierry Mugler, Chanel and Valentino. In 1992, she was earning a runway fee of $20,000 per show.

She has appeared in advertising campaigns for Chanel, Versace, Balmain, Giorgio Armani, Karl Lagerfeld, Dom Pérignon, Alberta Ferretti, Bulgari, Chloé, Escada, Blumarine, Dolce & Gabbana, Fendi, Max Mara, Louis Vuitton, Michael Kors, Oscar de la Renta, Ralph Lauren, Emporio Armani, Liz Claiborne, Prada, Yves Saint Laurent, Marc Jacobs, Guess?, Salvatore Ferragamo, Neiman Marcus, Gap, Dillard's, Saks Fifth Avenue, Revlon, Intergaz and Pepsi. In 1994, she starred in a campaign for Valentino, photographed by Arthur Elgort in Rome, which was inspired by the film La Dolce Vita. In 1997, Schiffer signed an exclusive worldwide contract with L'Oréal. Schiffer still holds a contract with L'Oréal and is one of their longest standing ambassadors.

As well as endorsing luxury brands, Schiffer has appeared as the face of high street retailers including Mango and Accessorize, and had her ears pierced for the first time specially for the 2006 Autumn/Winter Accessorize campaign. From her appearances in a 1998 Citroën advertisement she allegedly earned £3 million.

Schiffer was a judge on Fashion Fringe in 2011. In 2012, she posed for Guess? again, marking the brand's 30th anniversary.

Acting and media 
Schiffer made her film debut in the children's movie Richie Rich (1994, as the title character's personal fitness trainer). She then starred opposite Dennis Hopper and Matthew Modine in The Blackout (1997). She then went on to appear in Friends & Lovers, Black and White (both 1999), In Pursuit, Life Without Dick (both 2001), and Love Actually (2003) in a semi-cameo role. Films in which Schiffer has made cameo appearances include Ben Stiller's Zoolander (2001).

Schiffer has appeared on several talk shows such as The Oprah Winfrey Show, Larry King Live, Late Show with David Letterman, Late Night with Conan O'Brien, The Jonathan Ross Show, and sitcoms Dharma & Greg and Arrested Development. She made a cameo appearance in the music video for Bon Jovi's "Say It Isn't So" in 2000, and appeared in the music video for Comic Relief's 2001 charity single, Westlife's "Uptown Girl".

Charity work 
Schiffer began her involvement with UNICEF by becoming a member of the Arts & Entertainment Support Committee, and is currently a UK Goodwill Ambassador for the organization. Schiffer was also a spokesman for Make Poverty History, and appeared in their "Click" campaign. In July 2005, she appeared as a presenter at both the Berlin and Edinburgh Live 8 concerts.

Other work 
Schiffer has released four exercise videos, entitled Claudia Schiffer's Perfectly Fit, which reached the best seller list. Starting in 1992, Schiffer was the star of her own line of annual calendars. Her initial 1992 calendar sold more than 300,000 copies. Schiffer has hosted the French Fashion Awards, and also the 1995 World Music Awards in Monaco.

Along with fellow models Christy Turlington, Naomi Campbell, and Elle Macpherson, Schiffer was joint owner of a chain of restaurants called the Fashion Café in 1995. Schiffer helped present and carry the trophy with Pelé during the opening ceremonies at the 2006 World Cup. She also presented Prince William with a polo trophy in 2002.

Schiffer launched her eponymous cashmere collection during Paris Fashion Week in March 2011. The Autumn–Winter 2011 season saw her fashion design debut and was followed by a Spring–Summer 2012 collection.

Personal life 

In 1993, at a Berlin celebrity gala, Schiffer met the American magician David Copperfield when he brought her on stage to participate in a mind reading act and in his flying illusion, and they became engaged in January 1994. During this engagement, Schiffer sometimes appeared on stage with Copperfield to act as his special guest assistant in illusions including being levitated, guillotined, and sawn in half. She also appeared alongside Copperfield in David Copperfield: 15 Years of Magic, a 1994 documentary in which she played the role of a reporter interviewing him, and at the end of which they reprised their performance of the flying illusion. In September 1999, they announced they had ended their relationship, citing work schedules.

In 1997, Copperfield and Schiffer both sued Paris Match after the magazine claimed their relationship was a sham, that Schiffer "[was] paid for pretending to be Copperfield's fiancée and [didn't] even like him". In 1999, Schiffer won an undisclosed sum and a retraction from Paris Match when a French court ruled that the magazine's story was false. Copperfield's publicist confirmed that while Schiffer had a contract to appear in the audience at Copperfield's show in Berlin where they met, she was not under contract to be his "consort".

Following her break-up with Copperfield, Schiffer had a short relationship with art dealer and Green Shield Stamps heir Tim Jefferies until 2000. On 25 May 2002, she married English film director Matthew Vaughn in Suffolk. Schiffer and Vaughn have a son and two daughters.

Schiffer and Vaughn bought Coldham Hall, a Tudor manor house in Suffolk, in 2002. The couple has homes in Notting Hill, London, Northamptonshire and Coldham Hall, Stanningfield, Suffolk.

In 2002 an Italian kitchen porter was arrested after making nine visits to Coldham Hall; he was subsequently sectioned under the Mental Health Act. In 2004, a Canadian man was accused of harassing Schiffer, repeatedly leaving letters at her Suffolk residence.

The Pandora Papers list Schiffer as one of many celebrities who have used offshore financial constructs.

Filmography

Films

Documentaries

Television

Music video

See also 
 Fashion Cafe

References

External links 

 
 
 

1970 births
Living people
20th-century German actresses
21st-century German actresses
German expatriates in England
German female models
German film actresses
German television actresses
People from Wesel (district)
German fashion businesspeople
German fashion designers
German women fashion designers
People named in the Pandora Papers